Cupid in Clover is a 1929 British romance film directed by Frank Miller and starring George Wynn, Winifred Evans and Herbert Langley. It was adapted from the novel Yellow Corn by Upton Gray and made at Isleworth Studios in London.

Cast
 Winifred Evans - Lyddy
 George Wynn - Fred Amyon 
 Herbert Langley - John Simpson 
 Betty Siddons - Clary Simpson 
 Eric Findon - George Dowey 
 Charles Garry - Joe Dowey 
 Marie Esterhazy - Maggie 
 Wyndham Guise   
 James Knight   
 Jack Miller

References

Bibliography
 Low, Rachael. History of the British Film, 1918-1929. George Allen & Unwin, 1971.

External links

1929 films
1929 romance films
British romance films
Films based on British novels
Films shot at Isleworth Studios
British black-and-white films
British silent feature films
1920s English-language films
1920s British films